National Association of Muslim Lawyers (NAML) is an organization of muslim lawyers founded in 1996 as 'Muslim JD'. In 2000, it was renamed to its current name. NAML conducts an annual conference with over hundred legal professionals participating in it. It is a 501(c)(6) organization according to the IRS in the year 2001. According to a brief in the Supreme Court (USA), NAML is the premier organization for American muslim lawyers and "NAML’s activities include organizing educational programs on current legal topics of interest, supporting regional Muslim bar associations, and  serving the law-related needs of the general public through community service efforts." 

In 2005, the organization Muslim Advocates was founded as extension of NAML. In 2007, Shari'ah expert and president emeritus of NAML, Mohammad Fadel, who teaches law at the University of Toronto, quoted a Muslim jurist as saying that in Islamic law, when spouses disagree as to whether the husband has exercised lawful discipline or used excessive violence, it is presumed that the wife is telling the truth unless the husband is known for his piety. In 2017, the president of NAML, Asifa Quraishi-Landes criticised the law proposal American Laws for American Courts banning Sharia in Wisconsin spearheaded by Tom Weatherston stating "They see any acknowledgment of Sharia in American Muslim life as a first step to the Trojan Horse." In the murder case of Nabra Hassanen, NAML expected the criminal to receive a life sentence without parole.

See also
 National Association of Women Lawyers
 National LGBTQ+ Bar Association
 National Negro Bar Association

References 

Legal organizations based in the United States
Law-related professional associations
501(c)(6) nonprofit organizations
2001 establishments in the United States

American bar associations